Backstage is the fifth album by American singer-actress Cher, released in July 1968 by Imperial Records. This album was her first commercial failure, failing to chart. The album is by-and-large a covers album.

Album information 
Backstage was released in 1968, was produced once again by Sonny Bono with Denis Pregnolato and Harold R. Battiste Jr. and was Cher's last album on the Liberty Records subsidiary, Imperial Records.

The album was not a success and was her first to produce no hit singles. "The Click Song" and "Take Me For A Little While" were released as singles, but they did not chart.  Ten of the 12 tracks were also issued in 1970 as an LP on Sunset Records (Liberty Records' budget subsidiary) as This Is Cher (the songs "A House is Not a Home" and "Song Called Children" were not included).

In this year Cher recorded also others two songs: "Yours Until Tomorrow" and "The Thought Of Loving You". "Yours Until Tomorrow" was released as a single with "The Thought Of Loving You".

The album was re-issued on CD in 2007 along with the greatest hits release Golden Greats.

In 2016, the song "It All Adds Up Now" was used in the NatWest Advertisement campaign, with the title of the song being used as the company's slogan. This was following the success of Amazon TV ad using Sonny & Cher's hit "Little man"; evoking public's interest in Cher's early 1960s work.

Track listing

Personnel
 Cher – lead vocals

Production
 Sonny Bono – record producer
 Harold R. Battiste, Jr. – record producer
 Denis Pregnolato – record producer
 Stan Ross – sound engineer

Design
 Sonny Bono – photography 
 Woody Woodward – art direction

References

External links 
 Official Cher site
 Imperial Records Official Site
 

1968 albums
Cher albums
Liberty Records albums
Imperial Records albums
Albums arranged by Harold Battiste
Albums produced by Sonny Bono
Albums produced by Harold Battiste
Albums recorded at Gold Star Studios
Covers albums